Soumba is a football club from Soumba in the West African, state of Guinea. They play in the Guinée Championnat National, which is the highest league in Guinean football.

Stadium
Currently the team plays at the 1,000 capacity Stade Negueya.

References

External links
Soccerway

Football clubs in Guinea